This is the list of number-one singles in Japan during 1991 according to Oricon Chart

References 

Japan
1991 in Japanese music
Oricon 1991